Royal Nirvana  is a 2019 Chinese television series based on the novel of the same name by Xue Man Liang Yuan. It stars Luo Jin and Li Yitong. It started airing on Youku from November 12, 2019.

Synopsis 
Crown Prince Xiao Dingquan lost his mother and sister at a young age and his father, the Emperor, is distant towards him because he is backed by his maternal uncle General Gu and the army he controls. He lives on tenterhooks, fearful of losing the handful of people who are close to him. His father is a formidable figure whom he both respects and fears. Even as he strives to receive his love and approval, he is also afraid of the inevitable crushing disappointment if he fails.

Firstborn Prince Qi has designs on the throne and conspires against Dingquan with the help of his father-in-law, the powerful Chancellor Li Baizhou. They cause harm to befall the people he cherishes and widen the rift between the Emperor and Dingquan.

Teacher Lu Shiyu who is strongly influenced by Confucian values is a fatherly figure to Dingquan. He summons his student Lu Ying back to the capital with the intention of recommending the latter’s daughter Lu Wenxi to be the Crown Princess so as to help Dingquan gain an upright and trustworthy ally in court. Dingquan and Wenxi meet by chance when her brother gets into trouble and they develop mutual admiration although Dingquan has never seen what she looks like.

When Wenxi’s father and brother are thrown into jail, Wenxi goes undercover as a maid in the Crown Prince’s residence to help them. In the process, she quietly supports Dingquan to resolve two cases. Together, the couple manages to redress Wenxi’s father and brother’s case and bring the villains to justice. They are each other’s pillar of support as they brave dangers and make sacrifices to bring peace to the country.

Cast

Main

Supporting

Royal family

Officials

Others

Soundtrack

Production
The series is produced and directed by Yang Wenjun (Happy Memories of the Ma's; Best Director winner at Shanghai Television Festival). It is written by Xue Man Liang Yuan, the author of the original novel. Other notable cast members include style director William Chang and art director Chen Haozhong (Empresses in the Palace, Eternal Love).

The series began filming in May 2018 at Xiangshan Film and Television Town, and wrapped up in January 2019 at Dunhuang. Filming also took place in Wuxi and Inner Mongolia.

Reception
Douban gave the drama 7.1 out of 10 out of more than 57,000 user reviews.

Awards and nominations

References

External links
 
 

Television shows based on Chinese novels
Chinese historical television series
Chinese web series
Youku original programming
2019 Chinese television series debuts
2020 Chinese television series endings